Ted Ginn may refer to:
Ted Ginn Sr. (born 1955), American football coach
Ted Ginn Jr. (born 1985), American football player